The 2013–14 Pepperdine Waves men's basketball team represented Pepperdine University during the 2013–14 NCAA Division I men's basketball season. This was head coach Marty Wilson's third full season at Pepperdine. The Waves played their home games at the Firestone Fieldhouse and are members of the West Coast Conference. They finished the season 15–16, 8–10 in WCC play to finish in fifth place. They lost in the quarterfinals of the WCC tournament to Saint Mary's.

Before the season

Departures

Recruits

Roster

Schedule and results
All non-conference home games, and conference home games not picked up by the WCC regional packages, are shown on TV-32 in Malibu, known as Pepperdine TV. They are also shown on pepperdinesports.com at no cost for all fans to enjoy.

|-
!colspan=9 style="background:#0021A5; color:#FF6200;"|Regular Season

|-
!colspan=9 style="background:#FF6200; color:#0021A5;"| 2014 West Coast Conference men's basketball tournament

Game summaries

San Diego Christian
Series History: First Meeting
Broadcaster: Al Epstein

UC Riverside
Series History: Pepperdine leads 4-1

Central Michigan
Series History: Central Michigan leads 2-0

San Jose State
Series History: San Jose State leads series 24-21
Broadcaster: Al Epstein

Utah Valley
Series History: Utah Valley leads 1-0
Broadcaster: Al Epstein

Great Alaska Shootout: Green Bay
Series History: Green Bay leads series 1-0
Broadcasters: Brent Stover, Pete Gillen, & Rontina McCann

Great Alaska Shootout: Denver
Series History: First Meeting

Great Alaska Shootout: Indiana State
Series History: Indiana State leads 3-1

Cal State Fullerton
Series History: Pepperdine leads 11-10
Broadcaster: Al Epstein

UC Irvine
Series History: Pepperdine leads 11-10
Broadcaster:

Washington State
Series History: Series tied 3-3
Broadcasters: Rich Waltz and Ernie Kent

Houston Baptist
Series History: Pepperdine leads 1-0
Broadcaster: Al Epstein

San Diego
Series History: Pepperdine leads 56-40
Broadcaster: Al Epstein

BYU
Broadcasters: Ari Wolfe, Jarron Collins, and Kelli Tennant
Series History: BYU leads 8-4

Santa Clara
Broadcaster: Rich Cellini, John Stege, and Amanda Blackwell
Series History: Santa Clara leads 76-50

San Francisco
Broadcasters: Barry Tompkins and Jarron Collins
Series History: San Francisco leads 71-50

BYU
Broadcasters: Dave McCann, Blaine Fowler, and Spencer Linton
Series History: BYU leads 8-5

San Diego
Broadcasters: Eddie Doucette, Brad Holland, and Laura McKeeman
Series History: Pepperdine leads 57-40

Rankings

References

Pepperdine Waves men's basketball seasons
Pepperdine
Pepperdine
Pepperdine